Paul Bamela Engo (21 October 1931 – 26 April 2010) was a Cameroonian diplomat, judge and triple jumper who represented Nigeria at the 1956 Summer Olympics in Melbourne.

Engo was born in Ebolowa, Cameroon to the family of Fredrick Engo Mimbe and Elizabeth Ekoto Nku’u. His mother died when he was six and the family moved to Warri, Nigeria where his father worked. Engo attended Edo College, Benin and studied law at Middle Temple Inn, London. He was affiliated with the London Amateur Athletic Club prior to the Olympics. In Melbourne Engo qualified for the final round and improved on his previous attempts with a final round leap of  15.03m. Engo also finished ninth in the 1958 British Empire and Commonwealth Games triple jump.
After he finished studies in U.K. and qualified as a lawyer, he started work at the Federal Ministry of Justice, Lagos. Later he returned to Cameroon where he joined the foreign service and rose to the position of the Ambassador to the United Nations in New York.

He was also a justice of the International Tribunal for the Law of the Sea.

References

Nigerian male triple jumpers
1931 births
2010 deaths
People from Ebolowa
Olympic athletes of Nigeria
Athletes (track and field) at the 1956 Summer Olympics
Commonwealth Games competitors for Nigeria
Athletes (track and field) at the 1958 British Empire and Commonwealth Games
Cameroonian diplomats
Permanent Representatives of Cameroon to the United Nations
Cameroonian judges
Cameroonian judges of United Nations courts and tribunals
International Tribunal for the Law of the Sea judges